Keli Price is an American film producer and actor. Price executive produced the feature film Bandit, which was #1 on Apple TV for Independent Film, and #5 of all films on Apple TV in 2022. Price is known for his role as Chris Abeley in the Warner Bros. 
hit film The Clique

CEO of Price Productions and Co-Founder of Wave Motion Pictures. Price executive produced the feature film BANDIT, starring Mel Gibson, Josh Duhamel, and Elisha Cuthbert, which was #1 on Apple TV for Independent Film, and #5 of all films on Apple TV in 2022. Price is currently executive producing the feature film HELLFIRE, starring Stephen Lang, Harvey Keitel, and Dolph Lundgren. Price recently wrapped production on MURDER AT HOLLOW CREEK, which he wrote & produced, starring Jason Patric, Mickey Rourke, Penelope Ann Miller, and Casper Van Dien, that is set to be released in 2023. Price wrote & produced the feature film WOLF MOUNTAIN, starring Danny Trejo and Tobin Bell, also set to be released in 2023. He executive produced the thriller HOUSE OF GLASS, which was released on Nov. 30, 2021. Price produced the comedy REBOOT CAMP, starring David Koechner and Ed Begley Jr., which won the Austin Film Festival & was released in May 2021. Price directed and produced the feature documentary ON THIN ICE, a social justice-themed sports documentary featuring athletes Allyson Felix, Evander Holyfield, Robbie Rogers, Apolo Ohno, and Greg Louganis, which was picked up by Canadian Broadcasting Corporation and released in Feb. 2021. Price is currently producing six films slated to shoot in 2022 and 2023.

Biography

Personal life
Keli Price was born in Manhattan, New York.

He attended the Long Island High School for the Arts, where he was involved in both drama and music programs.

Career
At the age of four, Price entered the modeling industry, and has since worked for companies that include Polo Ralph Lauren, Gap, Sean John, H&M, Nike, Cole Haan, Tommy Hilfiger, and Macy's. Price also appeared on the cover of the New York Times Magazine and with Nelly on a nationwide campaign for Reebok.

Price has appeared in television shows such as 'About a Boy' (NBC) where he portrayed “Gus”, and 'Your Family or Mine' (TBS) where he played the role of "Colin" alongside Richard Dreyfuss and JoBeth Williams. He was also a series regular in a musical series entitled 'Side Effects' for E! and AwesomenessTV which was on Hulu. He's had lead roles in feature films such as "Murder at Hollow Creek" alongside Jason Patric, Mickey Rourke, Penelope Ann Miller, and Casper Van Dien, "The Hyperions" alongside Cary Elwes for Saban Films, "Wolf Mountain" alongside Danny Trejo & Tobin Bell, "Just Swipe" alongside Jodie Sweetin, "Karma's a Bitch" alongside Tony Todd & Natasha Henstridge, "Sleep No More" from the creator of Final Destination, the Warner Bros. film “The Clique” where he starred alongside Bridgit Mendler & Vanessa Marano as "Chris Abeley." The project was executive produced by Tyra Banks, Leslie Morgenstein, and Bob Levy, and was based on the bestselling novel by Lisi Harrison, "One Fall", produced by Dean Silvers (Spanking the Monkey, Flirting with Disaster), "Bart Bagalzby and the Garbage Genie", and "The Naked Brothers Band" (Nickelodeon) as the British Rocker, "Bobby Love." He was awarded the BMI Young Songwriter of the Year award and received the Abe Olman Scholarship Award for Excellence in Songwriting.

Films and television shows

References

Living people
American male film actors
American male television actors
Male models from New York (state)
Guitarists from New York City
People from Manhattan
American male guitarists
21st-century American singers
21st-century American guitarists
21st-century American male singers
Year of birth missing (living people)